is a railway station on the Tōkaidō Main Line of Central Japan Railway Company (JR Tōkai) in the city of Fukuroi, Shizuoka Prefecture, Japan.

Lines

Station layout
Fukuroi Station has two island platforms, connected by a footbridge with an elevated station building above the tracks. The outside tracks, Track 1 and Track 4, are not in regular use, except during peak times in the summer festival season. The station building has automated ticket machines, TOICA automated turnstiles and a staffed "Midori no Madoguchi" service counter.

Platforms

Layout

Adjacent stations

History
Fukuroi Station was opened on April 16, 1889 when the section of the Tōkaidō Main Line connecting Shizuoka with Hamamatsu was completed. From 1902-1962, it was an interchange station which also served the Akiha Line of the Shizuoka Railway. Regularly scheduled freight service was discontinued on January 21, 1984.

Station numbering was introduced to the section of the Tōkaidō Line operated JR Central in March 2018; Fukuroi Station was assigned station number CA29.

Passenger statistics
In fiscal 2017, the station was used by an average of 5324 passengers daily (boarding passengers only).

Surrounding area
Fukuroi City Hall

See also
 List of Railway Stations in Japan

References

Yoshikawa, Fumio. Tokaido-sen 130-nen no ayumi. Grand-Prix Publishing (2002) .

External links

home page

Railway stations in Japan opened in 1889
Railway stations in Shizuoka Prefecture
Fukuroi, Shizuoka